Jean Taché (b.  1698 –  April 18, 1768)  was a Canadian merchant and trader. He made his first trip to Canada in 1727 to deal in furs and engage in other business activities.  By 1730, he had become a permanent resident of the colony and was successful as a merchant and trader. He was also a militia captain in the government of Quebec.

France's surrender of the colony of Quebec in 1763 curtailed his business activities. Under the new British rule, he was one of the first Canadians to be called as members of the Grand Jury for the district of Quebec. In 1768, he received a commission as a notary but died shortly after. He had at least 10 children, and his descendents contributed to French-Canadian society during the 19th century.

References 

 

1698 births
1768 deaths
People from Tarn-et-Garonne
Pre-Confederation Quebec people